Mithun Shyam is an Indian Bharatanatyam dancer, choreographer and teacher based in Bengaluru. He has contributed to social and gender-based themes through classical dance.

Career
Shyam is a student of Guru Padmini Ramachandran and is trained in the Vazhuvoor style of Bharatanatyam. He is an 'A' graded artiste of Doordarshan and is also empanelled with the Indian Council for Cultural Relations. His dance productions include Purushantaragatah, Shyama Sundari, Manaha, 18 Golden Steps, Bibi Nachiyar, Gandarva Abhinaya, etc.  He established the dance institution Vaishnavi Natyashala, in Bengaluru in 1998.

Performances
 Raindrops Festival
 ICCR Horizon Series
 Dasyam Festival
 India International Centre
 Drishti Dance Festival
 Dasyam Festival
 Hampi Utsava
 Karthik Fine Arts
 Ananya Nritya Dhaare
 Narthaka Festival
 Rasa Sanje
 Nrityanjali Festival
 Nirgun Samaroh
 Kinkini Nrityotsava

Awards and accolades 

Yuva Kala Prathibha - presented by BCKA in 2014
Nrithya Sundaram - presented by Bharathanjali Trust in 2016
Young Natyacharya Award - presented by The Dance India in 2017
Kavi Sarvagna Prashasthi - presented by Kannada Rakshana Samithi in 2017
Kannada Natya Kausthubha Prashasthi - presented by Kannada Abhivrudhi Pradhikara in association with Kannada & Culture in 2018
Kala Rathna Prashasthi - presented by Akhila Karnataka Brahmana Yuvakara Sangha in2021
Natya kala Kesari - presented by Lios Club International in 2021
Kala Shreshta - presented by Sangeet Nritya Bharati Academy in 2022
Ustad Bismillah Khan Yuva Puraskar - presented by Sangeet Natak Akademi for the year 2020

References

External links 
 The New Indian Express

T he Hindu Business Line
 The Hindu 
 Deccan Herald
 Onmanorama

1982 births
Living people
Indian male dancers
Karnataka society
Bharatanatyam exponents
Indian dance teachers